Riverside Industrial Historic District, also known as Asheville Wholesale District, is a national historic district located at Asheville, Buncombe County, North Carolina.  The district encompasses 27 contributing buildings and 1 contributing structure (Southern Railway Tracks and Right of Way) in a predominantly industrial section of Asheville. Notable buildings include the Orpheus and Bertha Keener House (c. 1890), American Feed Milling Company (c. 1915), Italianate style Carolina Coal & Ice Company (c. 1905), Asheville Cotton Mill Cloth Warehouse (c. 1900), Standard Oil Company complex (c. 1916), and Farmers Federation Building (c. 1920).

It was listed on the National Register of Historic Places in 2004.

References

Industrial buildings and structures on the National Register of Historic Places in North Carolina
Historic districts on the National Register of Historic Places in North Carolina
Italianate architecture in North Carolina
Buildings and structures in Asheville, North Carolina
National Register of Historic Places in Buncombe County, North Carolina